Amaya Garbayo (born 26 March 1970) is a Spanish former swimmer who competed in the 1988 Summer Olympics.

References

1970 births
Living people
Spanish female swimmers
Spanish female freestyle swimmers
Olympic swimmers of Spain
Swimmers at the 1988 Summer Olympics
20th-century Spanish women